Tiaan is an English male given name, often a shortened form of Christian or Christiaan. It may refer to:

People
Tiaan Botes (born 2001), South African rugby player
Tiaan Cloete (born 1989), South African cricketer
Tiaan de Klerk (born 2001), Namibian rugby union player
Tiaan Dorfling (born 1990), South African rugby player
Tiaan Falcon (born 1997), New Zealand rugby player
Tiaan Fourie (born 2002), South African rugby player
Tiaan Kannemeyer (born 1978), South African road cyclist
Tiaan Liebenberg (born 1981), South African rugby player
Tiaan Louw (born 1988), Namibian cricketer
Tiaan Marx (born 1986), South African rugby union footballer
Tiaan Strauss (born 1965), South African rugby union footballer
Tiaan Swanepoel (born 1996), Namibian rugby union player
Tiaan Tauakipulu, New Zealand-born Australian rugby union player
Tiaan Thomas-Wheeler, (born 1999), Welsh rugby union player
Tiaan van der Merwe (born 1998), South African rugby union player
Tiaan van Vuuren (born 2001), South African cricketer

Fictional characters
Tiaan Jerjerrod, character in the original Star Wars trilogy

See also
Tian (disambiguation)
Christian (disambiguation)